is a city located in Nagasaki Prefecture, Japan. The part historically named Hirado is located on Hirado Island. With recent mergers, the city's boundaries have expanded, and Hirado now occupies parts of the main island of Kyushu. The components are connected by the Hirado Bridge. As of March 1, 2017, the city has an estimated population of 31,192 and a population density of 130 persons per km².

History
Hirado has been a port of call for ships between the East Asian mainland and Japan since the Nara period. During the Kamakura and Muromachi periods, the local Matsuura clan held the rights to trade with Korea and with Song-dynasty China. During the Sengoku and early Edo periods, Hirado's role as a center of foreign trade increased, especially vis-à-vis Ming-dynasty China and the Dutch East India Company (Vereenigde Oost-Indische Compagnie or VOC). The Portuguese arrived in Japan in 1543; after the Battle of Fukuda Bay in 1561 the Portuguese stayed for a few more years until they settled in the city of Nagasaki in 1571. The English and Dutch initially reached Japan at the beginning of the 17th century.

The first step in the profitable Dutch-Japanese trading relationship was the Shōgun's grant of a trading pass (handelspas) in 1609.

In 1613, the British ship Clove arrived in Japan and its Captain John Saris was able to gain the shogunate's permission to establish in Hirado a commercial house of the British East India Company. However, the company soon came to consider this outpost to be unprofitable, especially due to their inability to obtain Japanese raw silk for import to China. Therefore, the British closed their factory in 1623, voluntarily leaving the Dutch as the sole European presence.

At its maximum extent, the Dutch trading center covered the whole area of present-day Sakikata Park.  In 1637 and in 1639, stone warehouses were constructed, and the Dutch builders incorporated these dates into the stonework. However, the Tokugawa shogunate disapproved of the use of any Christian year dates, and therefore demanded the immediate destruction of these two structures.  This failure to comply with strict sakoku practices was then used as one of the Shogunate's rationales for forcing the Dutch traders to abandon Hirado for the more constricting confines of Dejima, a small artificial island in the present-day city of Nagasaki. The last VOC Opperhoofd or Kapitan at Hirado and the first one at Dejima was François Caron, who oversaw the transfer in 1641. However, modern research indicated that this incident might actually have been an excuse for the Shogunate to take the Dutch trade away from the Hirado clan. The stone warehouse from 1639 that was torn down was reconstructed back to its original form in 2011.
 
During the Edo period, Hirado was the seat of the Hirado Domain. Hirado Castle is today a historical and architectural landmark.

The island was the namesake of IJN cruiser Hirado.

The modern city was founded on January 1, 1955. The city expanded by merging on October 1, 2005, with the neighboring towns of Tabira, Ikitsuki, and the village of Ōshima. The local economy is dominated by agriculture, fishing and food processing.

Climate
Hirado has a humid subtropical climate (Köppen:Cfa) with hot summers and cool winters. Precipitation is significant throughout the year, but is much higher in the summer, although the relatively low latitude and its coastal location the city receives snow in small quantities but enough to "mark" the winter every year despite being in 33 ° N receives intrusions from the Arctic cold of the Siberia air combined with the humidity of the Sea of Japan.

Notable residents
 William Adams (1564–1620): Miura Anjin (三浦按針: "the pilot of Miura"), an English navigator, was the model for the character of John Blackthorne in James Clavell's novel Shōgun (1975). Died in Hirado.
 Camillus Costanzo (1571–1622): Italian Jesuit martyr.  Burnt alive in Hirado.
 Willem Verstegen (1612–1659) :merchant of the Dutch East India Company
 Tagawa Matsu (1601–1646): wife of Zheng Zhilong, mother of Koxinga and Shichizaemon
 Zheng Zhilong (1604–1661): Chinese merchant and pirate, father of Koxinga
 Koxinga (1624–1662): hero in mainland China, Taiwan and Ming general. Born in Hirado.
 Shichizaemon: second son of Tagawa Matsu
 Inagaki Manjiro (1861–1908): Diplomat. Born in Hirado.
 Ryusaku Yanagimoto (1894–1942): captain of the Sōryū in the Imperial Japanese Navy during World War II
 Kazuya Maekawa (1968–): former football player and current coach

International relations

Twin towns – Sister cities
Hirado has one sister city in Japan and one sister city and one friendship city outside Japan.
 Zentsūji, Kagawa, Japan (sister city)
 Nan'an, Fujian, China (friendship city)
 Noordwijk, South Holland, Netherlands (sister city) (used to be with Noordwijkerhout, which lost its municipal status in 2019 when it merged with Noordwijk)

Gallery

Notes

References
 de Winter, Michiel. (2006).  "VOC in Japan: Betrekkingen tussen Hollanders en Japanners in de Edo-periode, tussen 1602-1795" ("VOC in Japan: Relations between the Dutch and Japanese in the Edo-period, between 1602-1795"). 
 Edo-Tokyo Museum exhibition catalog. (2000). A Very Unique Collection of Historical Significance: The Kapitan (the Dutch Chief) Collection from the Edo Period—The Dutch Fascination with Japan. Catalog of "400th Anniversary Exhibition Regarding Relations between Japan and the Netherlands", a joint-project of the Edo-Tokyo Museum, the City of Nagasaki, the National Museum of Ethnology, the National Natuurhistorisch Museum" and the National Herbarium of the Netherlands in Leiden, the Netherlands. Tokyo.
 Satow, Ernest Mason, ed. (1900). The Voyage of Captain John Saris to Japan, 1613. London: Hakluyt Society...Link to digitized version from the collection of the University of California

External links

 Hirado City official website
 The Dutch Trading Post in Hirado
 Hirado City Tourism Association
 

 
Cities in Nagasaki Prefecture